Sir Iakoba Taeia Italeli  is a Tuvaluan politician who was the governor-general of Tuvalu from 16 April 2010, until 22 August 2019, when he resigned to contest in the 2019 general election.

He is also a former attorney general of Tuvalu who served from 2002 to 2006. He was the chancellor of the University of the South Pacific from July 2014 to June 2015.

In 2022 Italeli ran as Tuvalu's candidate to be the next Commonwealth Secretary-General. The aim was to fill the potential vacancy created if incumbent Patricia Scotland were to be prematurely disendorsed by a majority of member states, and to institute a pro-climate action agenda for the entire Commonwealth. At CHOGM 2022 in Kigali, Rwanda, Italeli withdraw after an initial straw poll the votes were ultimately spit between Jamaican candidate Kamina Johnson Smith and Lady Scotland, who was victorious and stayed on as Secretary-General.

Career
Prior to entering politics, Italeli served in the Tuvaluan police force for two decades. He worked his way up from constable to deputy commissioner.

In 2001, Italeli graduated from the International Maritime Law Institute at the University of Malta. He was appointed as acting Attorney General in 2002, a position kept until 2006. Italeli ran for public office for the first time in the Tuvaluan general election in 2006. He won the election, and became the representative of the Nui district in the Parliament of Tuvalu, a position kept for 4 more years. He also served as the Minister of Education, Sports and Health, in the government of the Prime Minister, Apisai Ielemia. He remained as minister until 2010 when he was appointed as governor-general.

He was appointed to the Most Distinguished Order of Saint Michael and Saint George as a Knight Grand Cross (GCMG) on 21 June 2010.

Constituency background
Italeli was elected to represent Nui in the Parliament of Tuvalu on a non-partisan basis; this lack of alignment is not unusual in the politics of Tuvalu; unusually for Tuvalu, Italeli represented a constituency where trilingualism is a feature, since many inhabitants of Nui originate from Kiribati, and thus speak Gilbertese, in addition to Tuvaluan and English, the fluency of which varies among local people.

His younger brother, Isaia Italeli, was elected to Parliament, also as MP for Nui, in the September 2010 general election, and subsequently became Speaker, then Minister for Works and Natural Resources.

Governor-General
In 2010, Italeli was appointed Governor-General of Tuvalu by Elizabeth II, Queen of Tuvalu.

In 2013, Italeli faced a political crisis when Prime Minister Willy Telavi's government lost a crucial by-election on 28 June and thereby lost its majority in parliament. The opposition thereafter held a majority of seats (eight to seven) and immediately called for the Prime Minister to advise that parliament be reconvened. Telavi responded that, under the constitution, parliament was required to convene only once a year and he was thus under no obligation to advise the Governor-General to summon it until December 2013. The opposition turned to Italeli and, on 3 July, he exercised his reserve powers by summoning parliament, against the Prime Minister's wishes, on 30 July. With only five members of the governing party and eight members of the opposition party in the legislature, the Speaker of the Parliament, Kamuta Latasi, still refused to allow a vote of non-confidence and Taom Tanukale, a member of Telavi's party, resigned his seat in parliament, prompting Telavi to assert that no confidence vote should be held until a by-election was conducted in Tanukale's district, but without giving a date for such an election. The opposition subsequently appealed again to the Governor-General, who then, on 1 August, replaced Telavi with the former opposition leader Enele Sopoaga as prime minister and ordered that parliament sit until 2 August to allow for the vote of non-confidence regarding Telavi's government to take place. On the same day, Telavi declared he had written to Elizabeth II, the Queen of Tuvalu, advising her to replace Italeli as governor general and that Italeli "had been fired". The Queen gave no indication of her reaction to Telavi's letter, leaving Italeli's position secure.

See also
 Politics of Tuvalu
 Tuvaluan constitutional crisis

References

External links
Sir Italeli Commonwealth Secretary-General campaign website

Living people
Attorneys General of Tuvalu
Governors-General of Tuvalu
Knights Grand Cross of the Order of St Michael and St George
People from Nui (atoll)
Tuvaluan politicians
Year of birth missing (living people)